Onchidium hardwickii is a species of air-breathing sea slug, a shell-less marine pulmonate gastropod mollusk in the family Onchidiidae. First discovered in 1992, this gastropod lives in most oceans.

References

 , preview

Onchidiidae
Gastropods described in 1850
Taxa named by John Edward Gray